The Maroochydore railway line, or CAMCOS (Caloundra and Maroochydore Corridor Options Study), is a proposed railway line on the Sunshine Coast, Queensland, Australia.

Planning history
Initial public consultation was conducted in January 1999, with newsletters and displays of aerial photographs. On 31 March 1999, Minister for Transport & Main Roads Steve Bredhauer announced that a route from the existing North Coast line at Beerwah through to Maroochydore had been decided on. The Queensland Government's Connecting SEQ2031 Infrastructure Plan, commits to the proposal, but doesn't state a proposed completion date. Further documentation on the Qld Government Transport and Main Roads website in July 2022 indicates that planning is continuing.

In July 2007, the City of Caloundra and Queensland Government commissioned a study into the realignment of the proposed corridor in Caloundra South. It is proposed the corridor be altered to run west of Golden Beach, and through the Caloundra Airport site.

The construction of a new 14 kilometre double track alignment on the North Coast line from Caboolture to Beerburrum to improve capacity in 2009 was a key requirement for the project, with the line scheduled to be duplicated through Beerwah to Landsborough by 2021.

In the 2022 federal budget, the Morrison Government announced a commitment of $1.6 billion towards the construction rail line to improve connectivity for the 2032 Brisbane Olympics. The federal government's funding was under the condition the project's budget would be under a 50:50 split with the Queensland Government.

Proposed stations
The 2009 proposal includes eight new stations, and one existing station:

 Maroochydore
 Mooloolaba
 Parrearra
 Kawana Town Centre
 Erang Street
 Aroona
 Caloundra
 Pelican Waters
 Beerwah (existing)

References

External links
Caloundra and Maroochydore Corridor Options Study
Queensland Transport Caloundra South CAMCOS Realignment Study

Brisbane railway lines
Proposed railway lines in Australia
Public transport in Sunshine Coast, Queensland
3 ft 6 in gauge railways in Australia